Talloires is a former commune in the Haute-Savoie department in the Auvergne-Rhône-Alpes region in south-eastern France. On 1 January 2016, it was merged into the new commune of Talloires-Montmin. Due to its setting on Lake Annecy Talloires has become a popular resort town not only since it has been rediscovered by a privileged society of artists and writers but also since the start of the 20th century when the place became a world-renowned location.

Geography
The town is situated in the French Alps, along a bay on the east side of the lake.

History
The area of Talloires has been settled since Neolithic times. In Roman times, Talloires was a stage on the consular road leading from Milan to Strasbourg; the town is however mentioned for the first time in the 9th century AD. In 1016 an abbey was founded here by King Rudolph III of Burgundy and monks from Savigny Abbey and Lyon. The now standing structures of the Abbey were built in 1681.  The famous chemist Claude Louis Berthollet was born in Talloires, then part of the Duchy of Savoy, in 1749.

Tourism
Talloires' mountainous landscapes and picturesque setting on Lake Annecy, medieval architecture, character, and summer and winter sports and activities, have created a small tourist industry in the village.

The summer activities in and around the Lake Annecy include sports (golf, water skiing, sailing, trekking in the surrounding Alps, tennis, canyoning, paragliding, horse back riding) and events (the annual Fête du Lac and Pyro Concerts). 
The area has hosted stages of the Tour de France several times, including a time trial stage around the lake. Talloires is close to ski resorts Megève, Espace Diamant, and La Clusaz.

Annecy is three and a half hours from Paris on the TGV high-speed trains. Geneva International Airport is 50 minutes away on the A43 highway.

The primary business of the town is tourism, although it is still a complete community in its own right, with a central church, post office, bank, library, and a small general store.

Conferences and education
Several international conferences have been conducted in Talloires, especially within the sustainable development and educational communities. The town was the birthplace of "The Talloires Declaration: University presidents for a Sustainable Future," an influential declaration on actions required by university leaders to reverse "environmental pollution and degradation, and the depletion of natural resources."  Several conferences of the Weatherhead Center for International Affairs at Harvard University have been held in Talloires.

Talloires was also the site of a September 2005 conference on university civic engagement. This conference of 29 university presidents produced the Talloires Declaration on the Civic Roles and Social Responsibilities of Higher Education, which calls upon the university to "use the processes of education and research to respond to, serve and strengthen its communities for local and global citizenship." The declaration established the Talloires Network, an association of universities committed to advancing the principles of the declaration. As of July 2012, 247 universities have signed the declaration and have become members of the Talloires Network.

Tufts University maintains its European Center in the local 11th-century (former) Benedictine priory.  The priory serves as a conference center and campus for visiting college students.

Images

See also
Communes of the Haute-Savoie department

References

External links

Official site

Former communes of Haute-Savoie
Populated places disestablished in 2016